Ramanattam (Malayalam: രാമനാട്ടം, IAST: Rāmanāṭṭaṃ) is a temple art in Kerala, India. The dance drama presents the story of Rama in a series of eight plays and was created under the patronage of Veera Kerala Varma (AD 1653–1694) alias Kottarakkara Thampuran. Ramanattom is based on a story from the epic Ramayana, covering the incarnation of Rama to the Rama-Ravana War, Ravana's defeat and Rama's crowning at Ayodhya. The story was written by Kottarakkara Thampuran and is divided into eight poetic sections so that each section can be enacted in one day. These eight sections are puthrakameshti, seetha swayamvaram, vicchinnabhishekam, kharavadham, balivadham, thoranayudham, sethubandhanam and yudham (war). Ramanattam is widely believed to be the immediate stem of the well known classical art form of Kerala, Kathakali.

Origin 
After the staging and creation of Krishnattam by the then Zamorin Raja of Calicut in 1657 AD, its fame spread all over Kerala. Its success induced the neighbouring chief of the Raja of Kottarakkara (Kottarakkara Thampuran) to request the Zamorin for the loan of a troupe of performers on the eve of some festive occasion. It is said that due to internal feuds and political rivalry between the chieftains of the neighbouring States, the Zamorin, besides refusing to send the performers, insulted and humiliated the Raja of Kottarakkara with the remark,

" It is useless to depute the troupe, because your (Raja of Kottarakkara's) court would be neither able to appreciate nor understand anything of the highly artistic Krishnattam and the high standard of the performance "

Here the political rivalry between the two chieftains turned into art rivalry and lead to the Kottarakkara Thampuran, initiating a parallel mode of entertainment, which he called Ramanattam. While the Zamorin of Calicut, Manaveda's Krishnattam was written in Sanskrit, the "language of the gods"; Ramanattam was in Malayalam, the language of the people.

References

Culture of Kerala
Hindu dance traditions
Performing arts in India
Dances of Kerala
Theatre in India
Masterpieces of the Oral and Intangible Heritage of Humanity
Arts of Kerala
Religious vernacular drama